EPID may refer to:
Electronic Portal Imaging Device used for image-guided radiation therapy, or
Enhanced privacy ID, a computer security and privacy identity technology.